Club Cipolletti is an Argentine sports club, located in the homonymous district of Río Negro Province. The football team currently plays in Torneo Federal A, the regionalised third division of Argentine football league system.

Cipoletti was relegated from Torneo Argentino A at the end of the 2005–06 season, due to the poor performance in the Clausura and its inability to beat General Paz Juniors in the relegation playoff.

At the end of the 2006–07 Cipolletti was one of the three champions of Torneo Argentino B allowing the team to return to Torneo Argentino A.

The team has played at the highest level of Argentine football (Primera División) on 6 occasions, having qualified to play in the National championships of 1973, 1975, 1977, 1979, 1980 and 1985, but never made it through the 1st group stage.

External links

 Official website

Cipolletti
Association football clubs established in 1926
1926 establishments in Argentina